Edella clava is a species of spider mite in the family Tetranychidae.

References

Ameroseiidae
Articles created by Qbugbot
Animals described in 1974